In Australia, an Aboriginal land trust (ALT) is a type of non-profit organisation that holds the freehold title to an area of land on behalf of a community of Aboriginal Australians. The land has been legally granted to a community by the government under a perpetual lease, usually after the community makes a formal claim of traditional ownership. Land granted under Aboriginal title is inalienable; it can not be bought, sold, traded or given away. The land trust is the organisation appointed by the community to legally hold the title deeds. The land trusts are administered by Aboriginal land councils.

Establishment and operation of Aboriginal land trusts
Several states and territories have enacted laws to establish Aboriginal land trusts, but not all.

New South Wales
An Aboriginal Lands Trust existed in New South Wales in the 1960s and into the 1970s, a body of which Lyall Munro Snr was a member, among others. This organisation  had land passed to it by the government as well as having some bequeathed to it in private individuals' wills. They were successful in winning various rights over land in various places, including hunting and fishing rights, without having to go to court. They were instrumental in the closing down of Kinchela Boys' Home and Cootamundra Girls' Home. They also encouraged young people to be initiated into their peoples' cultures.

A non-statutory NSW Aboriginal Land Council was created in 1977, to assist in the protests by Aboriginal people for their land rights, and the Aboriginal Land Rights Act 1983 created the NSWALC as a statutory body.

Northern Territory
In the Northern Territory, land trusts are governed under the Aboriginal Land Rights Act, 1976, which also governs the way in which groups can make claims to land. The ALTs hold the title to land handed back to the traditional Aboriginal owners through the Land Rights Act.

Queensland
In Queensland, there are many land trusts, holding about 5% of the land. They were created under the state's Aboriginal Land Act 1991 and the Torres Strait Islander Land Act 1991.

South Australia
In South Australia, there is a single statutory body known as the Aboriginal Lands Trust, also known as the South Australian Aboriginal Lands Trust (SAALT). It was created under the Aboriginal Lands Trust Act 1966. This Bill was introduced by Don Dunstan, who was then South Australia’s Attorney-General and Minister for Aboriginal Affairs, and who later became Premier. It holds title to Aboriginal land in South Australia and oversees the management and control of those lands including the ability to issue a lease over lands for 99 years to an "incorporated community body".  The Government of South Australia is also able to transfer other crown land to the control of the Trust.

The Lands Trust Act 1966 was the first land rights law in modern times and predated the 1967 Referendum. It allowed for parcels of Aboriginal land previously held by the South Australian Government to be handed to the Aboriginal Lands Trust of SA under the Act. It was held in perpetuity for the benefit of Aboriginal South Australians. The Trust was governed by a Board composed solely of Aboriginal people. In the 2013 Review of the Act, the powers of the Trust were reviewed and changed to modernise the Trust and the Aboriginal Lands Trust of South Australia Act 2013 (SA) was passed.

The other two Aboriginal landholding authorities in the state are Anangu Pitjantjatjara Yankunytjatjara (APY) and Maralinga Tjarutja, also statutory bodies.

Western Australia
The Aboriginal Lands Trust in Western Australia was created by the Aboriginal Affairs Planning Authority Act 1972. It acquires and holds land and manages it for the benefit of Aboriginal communities.

References

Further reading

External links
Legal documents by state, from the Agreements, Treaties and Negotiated Settlements Project:
Aboriginal Lands Trust, Western Australia 
Aboriginal Lands Trust, South Australia 
Aboriginal Land Trusts in Queensland 
Aboriginal Land Trusts in the Northern Territory 

Organisations serving Indigenous Australians
Native title in Australia
Land trusts